The 1848 Maine gubernatorial election, was an election held in 1848 in the state of Maine to decide Maine's next governor.

John W. Dana was the incumbent Democrat, and won the election. The challenger was Elijah Hamlin, of the Whig party who was the brother of future Vice President of the United States under Abraham Lincoln, Hannibal Hamlin.

Results

Candidates
 John W. Dana, Democrat, incumbent, winner
 Elijah Hamlin, Whig, brother of future Vice President of the United States Hannibal Hamlin 
 Samuel Fessenden, abolitionist and former Massachusetts legislator

Notes

Gubernatorial
1848
Maine